Sulpicio Acquaviva d'Aragona (died 1494) was a Roman Catholic prelate who served as Bishop of Conversano (1483–1494), and Bishop of Bitetto (1482–1483).

Biography
On 26 Apr 1482, Sulpicio Acquaviva d'Aragona was appointed by Pope Sixtus IV as Bishop of Bitetto. On 17 Feb 1483, he was appointed by Pope Sixtus IV as Bishop of Conversano. He served as Bishop of Conversano until his death in 1494.

See also 
Catholic Church in Italy

References

External links and additional sources
 (for Chronology of Bishops) 
 (for Chronology of Bishops) 

15th-century Italian Roman Catholic bishops
1494 deaths
Bishops appointed by Pope Sixtus IV